The 2009 Indianapolis Tennis Championships (also known as the Indianapolis Tennis Championships presented by Lilly for sponsorship reasons) was a tennis tournament played on outdoor hard courts. It was the 22nd edition of the event known that year as the Indianapolis Tennis Championships and was part of the ATP World Tour 250 series of the 2009 ATP World Tour. It took place at the Indianapolis Tennis Center in Indianapolis, United States, from July 20 through July 26, 2009. The Indianapolis Tennis Championships was the first ATP stop of the 2009 US Open Series.

ATP entrants

Seeds

*Seedings based on the July 13, 2009 rankings.

Other entrants
The following players received wildcards into the singles main draw
  Taylor Dent
  Rajeev Ram
  Devin Britton

The following players received entry from the qualifying draw:
  Alex Bogomolov Jr.
  Sébastien de Chaunac
  Jesse Levine
  Go Soeda

Finals

Singles

 Robby Ginepri defeated  Sam Querrey, 6–2, 6–4
It was Ginepri's first title of the year, and his third overall. It was his second win at Indianapolis, also winning in 2005.

Doubles

 Ernests Gulbis /  Dmitry Tursunov defeated  Ashley Fisher /  Jordan Kerr, 6–4, 3–6, [11–9]

External links

Official website